Muhammad Faiz bin Mohd Nasir (born 21 July 1992) is a Malaysian professional footballer who plays as a winger for Malaysian Super League club Terengganu and the Malaysia national team. He is dubbed as Terengganu's Lionel Messi due to his small physical size and height, in addition to his powerful skills on pitch, vision, ability, speed and endurance.

Early life 
Faiz was born and raised in Pasir Mas, Kelantan. He is the sixth of eleven siblings. He received his primary and secondary education in Kelantan, Sekolah Menengah Kebangsaan Tiang Chandi.

Club career 
Faiz began his football career playing for the Kelantan youth team in 2013. In 2014, Faiz signed with FAM League club PBAPP. He played for two seasons with PBAPP before decided to leave the club for Felcra  and signed one-year contract with the team.

International 
In March 2019, Faiz received his first call-up to the Malaysia national football team. He made his international debut when he came on a first eleven in a 2–1 2019 Airmarine Cup win with Afghanistan. In that match, a stunning strike out from the box led to his first goal of the tournament and national team.

In June 2019, Faiz was named in the 23-man for the FIFA World Cup Qualifier against Timor-Leste and he scored a goal which Malaysia won 7-1 trashing Timor Leste.

Career statistics

Club

International

International goals
''As of match played 7 June 2019. Malaysia score listed first, score column indicates score after each Faiz Nasir goal.

Honours

Club
 Kelantan
 President Cup : 2013

Terengganu
 Malaysia Premier League : runner-up  2017
 Malaysia FA Cup : runner-up  2018

References

External links 
 
 

Living people
Malaysian footballers
Malaysia international footballers
People from Kelantan
Association football midfielders
Kelantan FA players
Felcra FC players
Terengganu FC players
Selangor FA players
Malaysia Super League players
1992 births